Andrew Yan-Tak Ng (born 1976) is a British-born American computer scientist and technology entrepreneur focusing on machine learning and artificial intelligence (AI). Ng was a cofounder and head of Google Brain and was the former Chief Scientist at Baidu, building the company's Artificial Intelligence Group into a team of several thousand people.

Ng is an adjunct professor at Stanford University (formerly associate professor and Director of its Stanford AI Lab or SAIL). Ng has also made substantial contributions to the field of online education as the cofounder of both Coursera and deeplearning.ai. He has spearheaded many efforts to "democratize deep learning" teaching over 2.5 million students through his online courses. He is one of the world's most famous and influential computer scientists being named one of Time magazine's 100 Most Influential People in 2012, and Fast Company Most Creative People in 2014. In 2018, he launched and currently heads the AI Fund, initially a $175-million investment fund for backing artificial intelligence startups. He has founded Landing AI, which provides AI-powered SaaS products.

Biography 

Ng was born in the United Kingdom in 1976. His parents Ronald P. Ng and Tisa Ho are both immigrants from Hong Kong. He has at least one brother. Growing up, he spent time in Hong Kong and Singapore and later graduated from Raffles Institution in Singapore in 1992.

In 1997, he earned his undergraduate degree with a triple major in computer science, statistics, and economics from Carnegie Mellon University in Pittsburgh, Pennsylvania, graduating at the top of his class. Between 1996 and 1998 he also conducted research on reinforcement learning, model selection, and feature selection at the AT&T Bell Labs.

In 1998 Ng earned his master's degree from the Massachusetts Institute of Technology (MIT) in Cambridge, Massachusetts. At MIT he built the first publicly available, automatically indexed web-search engine for research papers on the web. It was a precursor to CiteSeerX/ResearchIndex, but specialized in machine learning.

In 2002, he received his Doctor of Philosophy (PhD) from the University of California, Berkeley, under the supervision of Michael I. Jordan. His thesis is titled "Shaping and policy search in reinforcement learning" and is well cited to this day.

He started working as an assistant professor at Stanford University in 2002, and as an associate professor at 2009.

He currently lives in Los Altos Hills, California. In 2014, he married Carol E. Reiley. They have two children: a daughter born in 2019 and a son born in 2021. The MIT Technology Review named Ng and Reiley an "AI power couple".

Career

Academia and teaching 
Ng is a professor at Stanford University departments of computer science and electrical engineering. He served as the director of the Stanford Artificial Intelligence Laboratory (SAIL), where he taught students and undertook research related to data mining, big data, and machine learning. His machine learning course CS229 at Stanford is the most popular course offered on campus with over 1,000 students enrolling some years. As of 2020, three of most popular courses on Coursera are Ng's: Machine Learning (#1), AI for Everyone, (#5), Neural Networks and Deep Learning (#6).

In 2008 his group at Stanford was one of the first in the US to start advocating the use of GPUs in deep learning. The rationale was that an efficient computation infrastructure could speed up statistical model training by orders of magnitude, ameliorating some of the scaling issues associated with big data. At the time it was a controversial and risky decision, but since then and following Ng's lead, GPUs have become a cornerstone in the field. Since 2017 Ng has been advocating the shift to high performance computing (HPC) for scaling up deep learning and accelerating progress in the field.

In 2012, along with Stanford computer scientist Daphne Koller he cofounded and was CEO of Coursera, a website that offers free online courses to everyone. It took off with over 100,000 students registered for Ng's popular CS229A course. Today, several million people have enrolled in Coursera courses, making the site one of the leading massive open online course (MOOCs) in the world.

Industry 
From 2011 to 2012, he worked at Google, where he founded and directed the Google Brain Deep Learning Project with Jeff Dean, Greg Corrado, and Rajat Monga.

In 2014, he joined Baidu as chief scientist, and carried out research related to big data and AI. There he set up several research teams for things like facial recognition and Melody, an AI chatbot for healthcare. In March 2017, he announced his resignation from Baidu.

He soon afterwards launched Deeplearning.ai, an online series of deep learning courses. Then Ng launched Landing AI, which provides AI-powered SaaS products.

In January 2018, Ng unveiled the AI Fund, raising $175 million to invest in new startups. In November 2021, Landing AI secured a $57 million round of series A funding led by McRock Capital, to help manufacturers adopt computer vision.

Research 

Ng researches primarily in machine learning, deep learning, machine perception, computer vision, and natural language processing; and is one of the world's most famous and influential computer scientists. He's frequently won best paper awards at academic conferences and has had a huge impact on the field of AI, computer vision, and robotics.

During graduate school, together with David M. Blei and Michael I. Jordan, Ng coauthored the influential paper that introduced latent Dirichlet allocation (LDA) for his thesis on reinforcement learning for drones.

His early work includes the Stanford Autonomous Helicopter project, which developed one of the most capable autonomous helicopters in the world. He was the leading scientist and principal investigator on the STAIR (STanford Artificial Intelligence Robot) project, which resulted in Robot Operating System (ROS), a widely used open source software robotics platform. His vision to build an AI robot and put a robot in every home inspired Scott Hassan to back him and create Willow Garage. He is also one of the founding team members for the Stanford WordNet project, which uses machine learning to expand the Princeton WordNet database created by Christiane Fellbaum.

In 2011, Ng founded the Google Brain project at Google, which developed large-scale artificial neural networks using Google's distributed computer infrastructure. Among its notable results was a neural network trained using deep learning algorithms on 16,000 CPU cores, which learned to recognize cats after watching only YouTube videos, and without ever having been told what a "cat" is. The project's technology is also currently used in the Android operating system's speech recognition system.

Online education: massive open online course 
In 2011, Stanford launched a total of three massive open online course (MOOCs) on machine learning (CS229a), databases, and AI, taught by Ng, Peter Norvig, Sebastian Thrun, and Jennifer Widom. This has led to the modern MOOC movement. Ng taught machine learning and Widom taught databases. The course on AI taught by Thrun led to the genesis of Udacity. Coursera was the 6th online education website that Ng built and arguably the most successful to date. The seeds of massive open online courses (MOOCs) go back a few years before the founding of Coursera in 2012. Two themes emphasized in the founding of modern MOOCs were scale and availability.

Founding of Coursera 
Ng started the Stanford Engineering Everywhere (SEE) program, which in 2008 published a number of Stanford courses online for free. Ng taught one of these courses, "Machine Learning", which includes his video lectures, along with the student materials used in the Stanford CS229 class. It offered a similar experience to MIT OpenCourseWare, except it aimed at providing a more "complete course" experience, equipped with lectures, course materials, problems and solutions, etc. The SEE videos were viewed by the millions and inspired Ng to develop and iterate new versions of online tech.

Within Stanford, they include Daphne Koller with her "blended learning experiences" and codesigning a peer-grading system, John Mitchell (Courseware, a Learning Management System), Dan Boneh (using machine learning to sync videos, later teaching cryptography on Coursera), Bernd Girod (ClassX), and others. Outside Stanford, Ng and Thrun credit Sal Khan of Khan Academy as a huge source of inspiration. Ng was also inspired by lynda.com and the design of the forums of Stack Overflow.

Widom, Ng, and others were ardent advocates of Khan-styled tablet recordings, and between 2009 and 2011, several hundred hours of lecture videos recorded by Stanford instructors were recorded and uploaded. Ng tested some of the original designs with a local high school to figure the best practices for recording lessons.

In October 2011, the "applied" version of the Stanford class (CS229a) was hosted on ml-class.org and launched, with over 100,000 students registered for its first edition. The course featured quizzes and graded programming assignments and became one of the first and most successful massive open online courses (MOOCs) created by a Stanford professor.

Two other courses on databases (db-class.org) and AI (ai-class.org) were launched. The ml-class and db-class ran on a platform developed by students, including Frank Chen, Jiquan Ngiam, Chuan-Yu Foo, and Yifan Mai. Word spread through social media and popular press. The three courses were 10 weeks long, and over 40,000 "Statements of Accomplishment" were awarded.

Ng tells the following story on the early days of Coursera: His work subsequently led to his founding of Coursera with Koller in 2012. As of 2019, the two most popular courses on the platform were taught and designed by Ng: "Machine Learning" (#1) and "Neural Networks and Deep Learning" (#2).

Post-Coursera work 
In 2019, Ng launched a new course "AI for Everyone". This is a non-technical course designed to help people understand AI's impact on society and its benefits and costs for companies, as well as how they can navigate through this technological revolution.

Venture capital 
Ng is the chair of the board for Woebot Labs, a psychological clinic that uses data science to provide cognitive behavioral therapy. It provides a therapy chatbot to help treat depression, among other things.

He is also a member of the board of directors for drive.ai, which uses AI for self-driving cars and was acquired by Apple in 2019.

Through Landing AI, he also focuses on democratizing AI technology and lowering the barrier for entrance to businesses and developers.

Publications and awards 
Ng is also the author or co-author of over 300 publications in robotics, and related fields. His work in computer vision and deep learning has been featured often in press releases and reviews.
1995. Bell Atlantic Network Services Scholarship
1995, 1996. Microsoft Technical Scholarship Award
1996. Andrew Carnegie Society Scholarship
1998–2000: Berkeley Fellowship
2001–2002: Microsoft Research Fellowship
2007. Alfred P. Sloan Research Fellowship Sloan Foundation Faculty Fellowship
2008. Massachusetts Institute of Technology (MIT) Technology Review, 35 Innovators Under 35 (TR35)
2009. IJCAI Computers and Thought Award (highest award in AI given to a researcher under 35)
2009. Vance D. & Arlene C. Coffman Faculty Scholar Award
2013. Time 100 Most Influential People
2013. Fortune 40 under 40 
2013. CNN 10: Thinkers
2014. Fast Company Most Creative People in Business
2015. World Economic Forum Young Global Leaders

He has corefereed hundreds of AI publications in journals like NeurIPS. He has also been the editor for the Journal of Artificial Intelligence Research (JAIR), Associate Editor for the IEEE Robotics and Automation Society Conference Editorial Board (ICRA), and much more.

He has given invited talks at NASA, Google, Microsoft, Lockheed Martin, the Max Planck Society, Stanford, Princeton, UPenn, Cornell, MIT, UC Berkeley, and dozens of other universities. Outside of the US, he has lectured in Spain, Germany, Israel, China, Korea, and Canada.

He has also written for Harvard Business Review, HuffPost, Slate, Apple News, and Quora Sessions' Twitter. He also writes a weekly digital newsletter called The Batch.

Books 
He also wrote a book Machine Learning Yearning, a practical guide for those interested in machine learning, which he distributed for free. In December 2018, he wrote a sequel called AI Transformation Playbook.

Ng contributed one chapter to Architects of Intelligence: The Truth About AI from the People Building it (2018) by the American futurist Martin Ford.

Views on AI 
Ng believes that AI technology will improve the lives of people, not that it is an anathema that will "enslave" the human race. Ng believes the potential benefits of AI outweigh the threats, which he believes are exaggerated. He has stated thatA real threat is regarding the future of work: "Rather than being distracted by evil killer robots, the challenge to labour caused by these machines is a conversation that academia and industry and government should have." A particular goal of Ng's work is to "democratize" AI learning so that people can learn more about it and understand its benefits. Ng's stance on AI is shared by Mark Zuckerberg, but opposed by Elon Musk.

In 2017, Ng said he supported basic income to allow the unemployed to study AI so that they can re-enter the workforce. He has stated that he enjoyed Erik Brynjolfsson and Andrew McAfee's "The Second Machine Age" which discusses issues such as AI displacement of jobs.

See also 
Robot Operating System
Latent Dirichlet allocation
Google Brain
Coursera

References

External links

Ng's Quora profile
Ng's Medium blog
Academic Genealogy
Andrew Ng's Publication List 

1976 births
Living people
American computer businesspeople
American computer scientists
American education businesspeople
American people of Hong Kong descent
American roboticists
American people of Chinese descent
American technology chief executives
American technology company founders
American technology writers
American venture capitalists
Artificial intelligence researchers
British emigrants to the United States
British people of Hong Kong descent
Businesspeople from California
Businesspeople from London
Carnegie Mellon University alumni
Computer vision researchers
Machine learning researchers
Massachusetts Institute of Technology alumni
People from Los Altos, California
Raffles Junior College alumni
Scientists from California
Scientists from London
Stanford University Department of Computer Science faculty
Stanford University School of Engineering faculty
UC Berkeley College of Engineering alumni
Writers from California
Writers from London
Natural language processing researchers
Baidu people
Google employees